Judo at the 2014 Summer Youth Olympics was held from 17 to 21 August at the Longjiang Gymnasium in Nanjing, China.

Qualification
Each National Olympic Committee (NOC) can enter a maximum of 2 competitors, 1 per each gender. 86 athletes will qualify at the 2013 Cadet World Judo Championships held in Miami, United States 8–11 August 2013. The medal winners in each weight category from the Cadet World Championships will qualify to the Youth Olympics provided the nation does not exceed its maximum quota. Should a nation have more than the maximum quota it must choose which athletes will compete at the Youth Olympics; the unchosen quota will then be allocated to the next best ranked athlete. As hosts, China is given the maximum quota and a further 16, 8 in each gender will be decided by the Tripartite Commission.

To be eligible to participate at the Youth Olympics athletes must have been born between 1 January 1996 and 31 December 1998. Furthermore, all athletes must have participated in the 2013 Cadet World Championships or Continental Youth Championships and have the minimum Grade Blue Belt.

Schedule

The schedule was released by the Nanjing Youth Olympic Games Organizing Committee.

All times are CST (UTC+8)

Medal summary

Medal table

Boys' Events

Girls' Events

Team Event

References

External links
 
 Official Results Book – Judo

 
2014 Summer Youth Olympics events
Youth Summer Olympics
2014
Judo competitions in China